Viviparus, common name the river snails, is a genus of large, freshwater snails with an operculum, aquatic gastropod mollusks.

They are primitive members of the clade Caenogastropoda. The old name of the genus was Paludina.

Distribution
This genus is palaearctic in distribution, and is known from the Jurassic to the Recent.

Species
Viviparus belongs to the subfamily Viviparinae. Its taxonomy is currently under development and many of its species are often included in other related genera. It includes the following species:

 † Viviparus achatinoides (Deshayes, 1838)
 Viviparus acerosus (Bourguignat, 1862)
 † Viviparus aitaiensis Jekelius, 1932
 † Viviparus alexandrieni Cobălcescu, 1883
 † Viviparus altecarinatus Brusina, 1874
 † Viviparus altus Neumayr in Herbich & Neumayr, 1875
 † Viviparus alutae Jekelius, 1932
 † Viviparus ambiguus Neumayr in Neumayr & Paul, 1875
 † Viviparus ampullaceus (Bronn, 1831)
 † Viviparus aquitanicus (Benoist, 1873)
 † Viviparus argesiensis (Stefanescu, 1896)
 Viviparus ater (de Cristofori & Jan, 1832)
 † Viviparus atriticus Neumayr, 1869
 † Viviparus aulacophorus Brusina, 1874
 † Viviparus balatonicus Neumayr in Neumayr & Paul, 1875
 † Viviparus bazavlukensis (Datsenko, 2000)
 Viviparus bengalensis (Lamarck)
 † Viviparus berbestiensis Lubenescu & Zazuleac, 1985
 † Viviparus bergeroni (Stefanescu, 1896)
 Viviparus bermondianus (d'Orbigny, 1842)
 † Viviparus berthae Halaváts, 1914
 † Viviparus berti Cobălcescu, 1883
 † Viviparus bifarcinatus (Bielz, 1864)
 † Viviparus bogdanovi Brusina, 1897
 † Viviparus botenicus Lubenescu & Zazuleac, 1985
 † Viviparus botezi (Porumbaru, 1881)
 † Viviparus bressanus (Ogérien, 1867)
 † Viviparus brevis Tournouer, 1876
 † Viviparus brevis trochlearis Tournouer, 1876
 † Viviparus brevis forbesi Tournouer, 1876
 † Viviparus brevis brevis Tournouer, 1876
 † Viviparus brevis carinatus Tournouer, 1876
 † Viviparus brevis gorceixi Tournouer, 1876
 † Viviparus brusinae Brusina, 1874
 † Viviparus bukowskii Oppenheim, 1919
 † Viviparus bulgaricus Brusina, 1902
 † Viviparus calverti Neumayr, 1880
 † Viviparus carenatus Lubenescu & Zazuleac, 1985
 † Viviparus cerchesi Cobălcescu, 1883
 † Viviparus cibyraticus (Spratt & Forbes, 1847)
 † Viviparus clathratus (Deshayes in Geoffroy Saint-Hilaire et al., 1832)
 † Viviparus conicus Pavlović, 1903
 Viviparus contectus (Millet, 1813) - Lister's river snail
 † Viviparus contiguus (Stefanescu, 1896)
 † Viviparus courtelaryensis (Rollier, 1892)
 † Viviparus craiovensis (Tournouër, 1880)
 † Viviparus cretzestiensis (Pavlov, 1925)
 † Viviparus crytomaphora Brusina, 1874
 † Viviparus cucestiensis Lubenescu & Zazuleac, 1985
 † Viviparus cyrtomaphorus Brusina, 1874
 † Viviparus dacianus Lubenescu & Zazuleac, 1985
 † Viviparus darchiaci Pavlović, 1903
 † Viviparus dautzenbergi Brusina, 1902
 † Viviparus dehmi Schlickum & Strauch, 1979
 † Viviparus deleeuwi Neubauer, Harzhauser, Georgopoulou, Mandic & Kroh, 2014
 † Viviparus depressus Strausz, 1942
 † Viviparus dezmanianus Brusina, 1874
 † Viviparus diluvianus (Kunth, 1865)
 † Viviparus duboisi (Mayer, 1856)
 † Viviparus eburneus Neumayr, 1869
 † Viviparus egorlycensis Volkova, 1955
 † Viviparus elatiorpseudoturritus Bogachev, 1961
 † Viviparus etelkae Halaváts, 1914
 † Viviparus falconensis Lubenescu & Zazuleac, 1985
 † Viviparus falsani (Fischer in Falsan & Locard, 1867)
 † Viviparus ferratus (Quenstedt, 1884)
 † Viviparus fuchsi Neumayr, 1872
 Viviparus georgianus (I. Lea, 1834) - banded mystery snail
 † Viviparus getianus Lubenescu & Zazuleac, 1985
 † Viviparus gibbus (Sandberger, 1880)
 † Viviparus glacialis (S. Wood, 1872)
 † Viviparus globulosus (Serres, 1853)
 † Viviparus glockeri (Quenstedt, 1884)
 † Viviparus glogovensis (Stefanescu, 1896)
 Viviparus goodrichi Archer, 1933 - globose mysterysnail
 † Viviparus gracilis Lörenthey, 1894
 † Viviparus graciosus Jekelius, 1932
 † Viviparus grandis Neumayr in Herbich & Neumayr, 1875
 † Viviparus heberti Cobălcescu, 1883
 † Viviparus hectoris (Hoernes, 1877)
 Viviparus hellenicus Westerlund, 1886
 † Viviparus herbichi Neumayr in Herbich & Neumayr, 1875
 † Viviparus hoernesi Neumayr, 1869
 † Viviparus inflexus (Ludwig, 1865)
 Viviparus intertextus (Say, 1829) - rotund mysterysnail
 † Viviparus jalpuchensis (Datsenko in Gozhik & Datsenko, 2007)
 Viviparus japonicus Von Martens
 † Viviparus jarcae Cobălcescu, 1883
 † Viviparus karaganicus Volkova, 1955
 † Viviparus kaschpurica (Pavlov, 1925)
 † Viviparus kurdensis Lörenthey, 1894
 † Viviparus lacedaemoniorum Oppenheim, 1891
 † Viviparus leiostraca Brusina, 1874
 † Viviparus lignitarum Neumayr in Neumayr & Paul, 1875
 Viviparus limi Pilsbry, 1918 - Ochlockonee mysterysnail
 † Viviparus loczyi Halaváts, 1903
 † Viviparus lomejkoi Pavlović, 1932†
 † Viviparus loxostomus (Sandberger, 1875)
 † Viviparus lubenescuae Neubauer, Harzhauser, Georgopoulou, Mandic & Kroh, 2014
 † Viviparus lungershauseni Bogachev, 1961
 † Viviparus macarovicii Lubenescu & Zazuleac, 1985
 Viviparus mamillatus (Küster, 1852)
 † Viviparus mammatus (Stefanescu, 1889)
 † Viviparus mandarinicus (Seninski, 1905)
 † Viviparus mangikiani Bogachev, 1961
 † Viviparus marnyanus Bogachev, 1961
 † Viviparus mazuranici Brusina, 1902
 † Viviparus megarensis Fuchs, 1877
 † Viviparus mehedintzensis Lubenescu & Zazuleac, 1985
 Viviparus monardi (Haas, 1934)
 † Viviparus monasterialis Fontannes, 1887
 † Viviparus monspesulanus Wenz, 1928
 † Viviparus motasi Papaianopol & Macaleț, 2004
 † Viviparus motruensis (Stefanescu, 1896)
 † Viviparus multicostatus (Seninski, 1905)
 † Viviparus murgescui Cobălcescu, 1883
 † Viviparus muscelensis (Stefanescu, 1897)
 † Viviparus neumayri Brusina, 1874
 † Viviparus neustruevi (Pavlov, 1925)
 † Viviparus nodosocostatus Halaváts, 1887
 † Viviparus nothus Brusina, 1874
 † Viviparus novskaensis Penecke, 1886
 † Viviparus oncophorae Rzehak, 1893
 † Viviparus oncophorus Brusina, 1874
 † Viviparus ornatus Neumayr in Neumayr & Paul, 1875
 † Viviparus ovidii Bogachev, 1961
 † Viviparus ovidiiformis (Datsenko in Gozhik & Datsenko, 2007)
 † Viviparus ovulum Neumayr in Neumayr & Paul, 1875
 † Viviparus pachystoma (Sandberger, 1859)
 † Viviparus pannonicus Neumayr in Neumayr & Paul, 1875
 † Viviparus pantanellii Wenz, 1919
 † Viviparus pauli Brusina, 1874
 † Viviparus phasianella (Boettger, 1887)
 † Viviparus pilari Brusina, 1874
 † Viviparus pollonerae Sacco, 1884
 † Viviparus praecursus (Tournouër, 1879)
 † Viviparus prahovensis Lubenescu & Zazuleac, 1985
 † Viviparus precraiovensis Lubenescu & Zazuleac, 1985
 † Viviparus prutulensis (Datsenko, 2002)
 † Viviparus pseudoachatinoides (Pavlov, 1925)
 † Viviparus pseudodezmanianus Lubenescu & Zazuleac, 1985
 † Viviparus pseudogracilis Strausz, 1942
 † Viviparus pseudomotruensis Bogachev, 1961
 † Viviparus pseudosadleri (Pavlov, 1925)
 † Viviparus pseudovukotinovici Jekelius, 1932
 † Viviparus pulchriformis Papp in Papp & Thenius, 1952
 Viviparus quadratus Benson, 1842
 Viviparus quadratus disparis
 † Viviparus recurrens Penecke, 1886
 † Viviparus rhodensis Bukowski, 1892
 † Viviparus romaloi Cobălcescu, 1883
 † Viviparus rothi Lörenthey, 1906
 † Viviparus rudis Neumayr, 1869
 † Viviparus rumanus (Tournouër, 1879)
 † Viviparus sadleri Neumayr, 1869
 † Viviparus semseyi Halaváts, 1903
 † Viviparus serresi Wenz, 1928
 Viviparus sphaeridius (Bourguignat, 1880)
  † Viviparus spurius Brusina, 1874
 † Viviparus stefanescui (Stefanescu, 1896)
 † Viviparus stevanovici Neubauer, Harzhauser, Kroh, Georgopoulou & Mandic, 2014
 † Viviparus stricturatus Neumayr, 1869
 † Viviparus strossmayerianus Brusina, 1874
 † Viviparus sturi Neumayr, 1869
 † Viviparus subconcinnus (Sinzov, 1876)
 † Viviparus sublentus d'Orbigny, 1850
 Viviparus subpurpureus (Say, 1829) - olive mystery snail
 † Viviparus suessi Neumayr in Neumayr & Paul, 1875
 † Viviparus suessoniensis (Deshayes, 1826)
 † Viviparus suevicus Wenz, 1919
 † Viviparus sukljei Jenko, 1944
 † Viviparus symeonidisi Schütt, 1986
 † Viviparus syzranicus (Pavlov, 1925)
 † Viviparus tardyanus Locard, 1883
 † Viviparus teschi Meijer, 1990
 † Viviparus tohanensis Lubenescu & Zazuleac, 1985
 † Viviparus tomici Brusina, 1902
 † Viviparus transitorius (Stefanescu, 1889)
 † Viviparus treffortensis Delafond & Depéret, 1893
 Viviparus tricinctus Liu, Zhang & Wang, 1994
 † Viviparus tuberculatus Berdnikova, 1977
 † Viviparus tumidus Stefanescu, 1896
 † Viviparus turgidus (Bielz, 1864)
 † Viviparus uva (Stefanescu, 1897)
 † Viviparus ventricosus (Sandberger, 1875)
 † Viviparus viminaticus Brusina, 1902
 † Viviparus vinodoli Koch, 1922
 Viviparus viviparus (Linnaeus, 1758) - river snail
 † Viviparus volgensis (Pavlov, 1925)
 † Viviparus vukotinovicii (Frauenfeld, 1862)
 † Viviparus wesselinghi Neubauer, Harzhauser, Georgopoulou, Mandic & Kroh, 2014
 † Viviparus wolfi Neumayr in Neumayr & Paul, 1875
 † Viviparus woodwardi Brusina, 1885
 † Viviparus zelebori Neumayr, 1869

Species brought into synonymy
 † Viviparus bifarcinatus stricturatus Neumayr, 1869 : synonym of † Viviparus woodwardi Brusina, 1885
 † Viviparus dezmanianus dacicus Lubenescu & Zazuleac, 1985: synonym of † Viviparus dezmanianus turbureensis Fontannes, 1887
  † Viviparus incertus Macarovici, 1940: synonym of  † Viviparus wesselinghi Neubauer, Harzhauser, Georgopoulou, Mandic & Kroh, 2014
 Viviparus malleatus Reeve: synonym of Cipangopaludina malleata (Reeve, 1863)
 † Viviparus rudis strossmayerianus Brusina, 1874: synonym of † Viviparus strossmayerianus Brusina, 1874
 † Viviparus woodwardi argesiensis (Stefanescu, 1896): synonym of † Viviparus argesiensis (Stefanescu, 1896)

References 

 Vaught, K.C. (1989). A classification of the living Mollusca. American Malacologists: Melbourne, FL (USA). . XII, 195 pp.

External links 
 

Viviparidae